The Porcelain factory Fraureuth Joint-stock company in Fraureuth was one of the biggest and best standard porcelain factories of the German Reich.

Foundation

Rise and growing demand

Decline until 1934

Structure of the company

References
Translated from the equivalent article on the German Wikipedia.
S. Fraas: „Wachgeküßt“. Verborgene Schätze der Fraureuther Porzellanfabrik. Dt. Porzellanmuseum, Hohenberg/Eger 2003,

External links

fraureuth.de
sn.schule.de

Ceramics manufacturers of Germany
German porcelain